Marco Paulo Faria de Lemos (born 28 May 1973), known as Marco Paulo, is a Portuguese retired footballer who played as a central midfielder, currently a manager.

Playing career
Born in Sintra, Lisbon metropolitan area, Marco Paulo spent seven of his first eight years as a senior with local G.D. Estoril Praia, playing his first two seasons in the Primeira Liga and a further five in the Segunda Liga. After two years with F.C. Paços de Ferreira, one in each major level, he returned to the capital and joined C.F. Os Belenenses.

Marco Paulo was regularly used in his four-season spell at the Estádio do Restelo, inclusively serving as team captain. Aged 32, he returned to the second division and Estoril, acting as interim player-coach for five games and achieving only one draw, after which he returned to the top flight with C.F. Estrela da Amadora.

After 21 league appearances in his debut campaign, veteran Marco Paulo was sparingly used the following two, with Estrela also being relegated in 2009 due to financial irregularities. He closed out his career at 37 after one year with another club in the Lisbon area, C.D. Mafra, amassing top-tier totals of 244 matches and nine goals.

Coaching career
Marco Paulo was appointed director of football at former side Belenenses in early April 2010. On 17 February 2012, with the side ranking 11th in division two, he replaced José Mota as head coach, eventually leading them to the fifth position.

With the club again in the top flight, Marco Paulo replaced Mitchell van der Gaag after the latter stepped down early in the season due to health problems. He was relieved of his duties in March 2014, due to poor results.

References

External links

1973 births
Living people
People from Sintra
Sportspeople from Lisbon District
Portuguese footballers
Association football midfielders
Primeira Liga players
Liga Portugal 2 players
Segunda Divisão players
S.U. Sintrense players
G.D. Estoril Praia players
O Elvas C.A.D. players
F.C. Paços de Ferreira players
C.F. Os Belenenses players
C.F. Estrela da Amadora players
C.D. Mafra players
Portugal under-21 international footballers
Portuguese football managers
Primeira Liga managers
Liga Portugal 2 managers
G.D. Estoril Praia managers
C.F. Os Belenenses managers